Tiexi Gymnasium is an indoor sporting arena located in Yingkou, Liaoning, China. The capacity of the arena is 4,500 spectators and opened in 2008. It hosts indoor sporting events such as basketball and volleyball. It hosts the Liaoning Flying Leopards of the Chinese Basketball Association.

References 

Indoor arenas in China
Sports venues in Liaoning